Riches & More is a compilation album for the Scottish rock band Deacon Blue.  It combines the Riches (a limited edition bonus album that was temporarily packaged with copies of the album Raintown) with the Four Bacharach & David Songs EP.  However, this compilation does not include the piano version of the song "Raintown", which was the fifth track on the initial release of Riches.

Track listing
All songs written by Ricky Ross, except where noted:

  "Which Side Are You On" (F. Reece) – 2:59
  "Kings of the Western World" – 2:39
  "Angeliou" (Van Morrison) – 6:19
  "Just Like Boys" (Ross, Prime) – 3:13
  "Riches" – 2:39
  "Church" – 3:18
  "Shifting Sand" (Ross, Prime) – 3:18
  "Suffering" – 2:44
  "Ribbons and Bows" – 4:15
  "Dignity [Bob Clearmountain Version]" – 4:13
  "I'll Never Fall in Love Again" (Bacharach, David) – 2:46
  "The Look of Love" (Bacharach, David) – 3:37
  "Are You There (With Another Girl)" (Bacharach, David) – 3:22
  "Message to Michael" (Bacharach, David) – 3:57

 Tracks 1, 7, and 8 produced by Deacon Blue
 Tracks 2, 5, 9, 11, 12, 13, and 14 produced by Jon Kelly
 Track 3 produced by Richard Moakes and Deacon Blue
 Track 4 produced by Jon Kelly with overdub and additional recording by Deacon Blue and Richard Moakes
 Track 6 produced by Kenny MacDonald and Deacon Blue
 Track 10 produced by Bob Clearmountain

Personnel
Ricky Ross – vocals, guitar, piano, keyboard
Lorraine McIntosh – vocals
James Prime – keyboard
Ewen Vernal – bass
Graeme Kelling – guitar
Dougie Vipond – drums

Deacon Blue albums
Albums produced by Bob Clearmountain
Albums produced by Jon Kelly
1997 compilation albums
Columbia Records compilation albums